The 2018 edition of the Solar Decathlon China will take place in Dezhou, China.

Solar Decathlon China 2018 

 : Beijing Jiaotong University
 : The University of Hong Kong
 : College of Management Academic Studies (COMAS) Afeka College (Israel)
 , : Shandong University; Xiamen University; National Institute of Applied Sciences of Rennes; University of Rennes 1/Superior School of Engineering of Rennes; University of Rennes 2/Institute of Management and Urbanism of Rennes; * High School Joliot Curie of Rennes; Technical School of Compagnons du Devoir of Rennes; European Academy of Art in Brittany (EESAB); National School of Architecture of Brittany; (China-France)
 : McGill University and Concordia University (Canada)
 , :New Jersey Institute of Technology and Fujian University of Technology (United States-China)
 , :South China University of Technology and Polytechnic University of Turin (China-Italy)
 , :Southeast University and Technical University of Braunschweig (China-Germany)
 : Indian Institute of Technology Bombay (India)
 : Shenyang Institute of Engineering (China)
 , :Shanghai Jiaotong University and University of Illinois at Urbana-Champaign (China-United States)
 : Hunan University (China)
 :Seoul National University; Sung Kyun Kwan University; AJOU University (Korea)
 : Shanghai University of Engineering Science (China)
 : Tsinghua University (China)
 , : Tongji University and Technical University of Darmstadt (China-Germany)
 : University of Toronto; Ryerson University; Seneca College (Canada)
 : University of Nottingham, Ningbo, China (China)
 : Xi'an University of Architecture and Technology (China)
 , : Xi'an Jiaotong University and Western New England University (China-United States)
 , : Yantai University and Illinois Institute of Technology (China-United States).

Withdrawn teams: 
 : Istanbul Technical University; Istanbul Kültür University; Yildiz Technical University (Turkey)

Solar Decathlon China 2013 

Teams:

The first Solar Decathlon China was held in Datong, China, August 2–13, 2013.

The top finishers were:

 : University of Wollongong (Australia)
 : South China University of Technology (China)
 : Chalmers University of Technology (Sweden).

The other participating teams were:

 , : Tsinghua University and Florida International University (China-United States)
 , : Polytechnic Institute of New York University, Ghent University, and Worcester Polytechnic Institute (Belgium-United States)
 : Abbaspour University of Technology (Iran)
 , : Peking University and University of Illinois at Urbana-Champaign (China-United States)
 : Tel Aviv University, Shenkar College of Engineering and Design, Neri Bloomfield School of Design and Education, College of Management Academic Studies (Israel)
 : Inner Mongolia University of Technology (China)
 , : Alfred State College and Guilin University of Technology and Alfred University (China-United States)
 , : London Metropolitan University and Guangzhou Academy of Fine Arts (England-China)
 : Shandong Jianzhu University (China)
 : Shanghai Jiaotong University (China)
 : Southeast University (China)
 , : Beijing Jiaotong University and Bern University of Applied Sciences (China-Switzerland)
 , : New Jersey Institute of Technology and Harbin Institute of Technology (United States-China)
 : Universiti Teknologi Malaysia (Malaysia)
 : Xiamen University (China)
 : Xi'an University of Architecture and Technology (China)
 : National University of Singapore (Singapore).

See also

 Solar Decathlon
 Solar Decathlon Africa
 Solar Decathlon Europe
 Solar Decathlon Latin America and Caribbean
 Solar Decathlon Middle East

References

External links
U.S. Department of Energy Solar Decathlon
Solar Decathlon Europe 2010 & 2012

Sustainable building
Building engineering
Sustainable architecture
Low-energy building
Energy conservation
Solar Decathlon